Vladimir Tyumentsev (born 13 February 1982) is a Russian freestyle skier. He competed in the men's moguls event at the 2002 Winter Olympics.

References

1982 births
Living people
Russian male freestyle skiers
Olympic freestyle skiers of Russia
Freestyle skiers at the 2002 Winter Olympics
Sportspeople from Tomsk